Manuel Bilches (born 25 May 1957), is a former Argentine football player and current manager.

Playing career 
Bilches began playing at the youth level with Mendoza. In his native Argentina he had stints with Club Atlético Independiente and Club Atlético Huracán. In 1972, he moved to Canada and had a trial with Toronto Metros in the North American Soccer League. He resumed playing in Southern Ontario in 1974 where he played in the provincial circuit of the National Soccer League with Hamilton-Italo Canadians. After a season in Hamilton, he traveled to Western Canada to train with the Vancouver Whitecaps. 

In 1977, he started playing in the Alberta Major Soccer League with Edmonton Victoria. Throughout the season he was selected to the Edmonton Select team which faced Eintracht Braunschweig. After the conclusion of the summer season, he played in the Edmonton Indoor Soccer League with Edmonton Croatia during the 1978 winter season. He trained with California Surf and played in several preseasons matches the following season.  

In 1979, he resumed playing in the local Alberta soccer circuit with Northwest United. He re-signed with Northwest the following season.

Managerial career 
Bilches began transitioning to the managerial side by becoming the player-coach for Team Argentina in the 1978 Mini World Cup soccer tournament. In the winter of 1980, he served as the head coach for Edmonton Italo-Canadians in the Edmonton District Soccer Association's indoor league. In 1990, he returned to the province of Ontario to manage America United in the National Soccer League. He was the head coach for NSL rivals Scarborough International for the 1991 season. He continued coaching in the NSL in 1993 when he was hired by Windsor Wheels in the preseason. Unfortunately, his stint in Windsor was short-lived as he was dismissed after the arrival of new ownership.

The Ontario Soccer Association named Bilches as their under-15 provincial head coach in 1995. He began managing the Honduran side Atlético Independiente during the 1997-98 season. After his stint in Honduras, he began managing at the international level in 1999 when he was named the head coach for the Belize national football team and managed the squad throughout the 1999 UNCAF Nations Cup. The Football Federation of Belize renewed his contract in late 1999 and also served as the head coach for the under-23 national team. Bilches received some criticism during his helm with the national team as several players disagreed over his coaching style. 

In 2005, he was named the technical director for Persipura Jayapura in the Liga Indonesia Premier Division where the club would claim the championship title against Persija Jakarta. He would return to manage in Indonesia in late 2006 when he signed with PSM Makassar and extended his contract for the 2007 season. Unfortunately, he resigned from his position before the commencement of the 2007 season. 

In 2011, he was named the head coach for Curaçao. Throughout his tenure with Curaçao, the team failed to advance past the group stage in the 2014 FIFA World Cup qualification.

References

External links
 

1957 births
Living people
Argentine football managers
Expatriate football managers in Belize
Belize national football team managers
Expatriate football managers in Curaçao
Curaçao national football team managers
Canadian National Soccer League coaches
Canadian National Soccer League players
Association footballers not categorized by position
Association football players not categorized by nationality
Argentine expatriate football managers
Argentine expatriate sportspeople in Belize
Argentine expatriate sportspeople in Curaçao
Argentine expatriate sportspeople in Canada